The Spanish Society for Immunology (Sociedad Española de Inmunología, SEI) is a legally recognized professional non-profit organization in Spain, dedicated to promote and support excellence in research, scholarship and clinical practice in immunology. It has 908 members in the field of health, research, teaching and industry, almost all Spanish, but also Latin American. It was founded in 1975 by Fernando Ortiz Masllorens.

Every year the society organizes national congresses in different Spanish cities and publishes a scientific journal called Inmunología, founded in 1982, a quarterly publication  in Spanish and English on the biology, physiology and pathology of the immune system.

The current president of the society is Prof. Dr. África González Fernández, also the executive director of the Biomedical Research Center at the University of Vigo.

References

Immunology professional associations
Medical and health organisations based in Spain
Organizations established in 1975